China Media Group (Chinese: 中央广播电视总台; lit. Central Radio and Television General Station) also known as Voice of China, is the predominant state media company by means of radio and television broadcasting in the People's Republic of China. It was founded on 21 March 2018, as a fusion of all state-holding media enterprises including China Central Television, China National Radio, and China Radio International. China Media Group is under the direct control of the Central Propaganda Department of the Chinese Communist Party.

History 

On 21 March 2018, the Government of the People's Republic of China announced that China Central Television, China National Radio, and China Radio International was officially renamed to become China Media Group, after the first session of the 13th National People's Congress. That same day, Shen Haixiong, was officially named President of China Media Group.

During the 2018 party and government reform in China, CMG was created to serve as a unified holding company of the People's Republic's national and international radio and television broadcasting services.

In 2020, several of CMG's assets, particularly China Global Television Network and China Radio International, were designated as foreign missions by the United States Department of State.

List of presidents

See also 

 Mass media in China
 National Radio and Television Administration
 Xinhua News Agency

Notes

References 

 
Chinese companies established in 2018
Mass media companies established in 2018
Companies based in Beijing
Mass media in Beijing
Publicly funded broadcasters
Television stations in China
Chinese-language television stations
Radio stations in China
Chinese-language radio stations
Chinese propaganda organisations
Conspiracist media